The Great Rebellion or Great Revolt is a term that is generally used in English for the following conflicts:

 First Jewish–Roman War in 66–73 CE, also known as the Great Revolt of Judaea
 Peasants' Revolt in England in 1381, also called Wat Tyler's Rebellion
 English Civil War in 1642–1651, also called English Revolution
 Rebellion of Túpac Amaru II in 1780–83, against Bourbon reforms in the Spanish Viceroyalty of Peru
 Wars of the Three Kingdoms, an intertwined series of conflicts that took place in England, Ireland and Scotland between 1639 and 1651, including the English Civil War
 Indian Rebellion of 1857, against the British East India Company
 In the northern states of the US, an alternate term used in naming the American Civil War (1861–65)
 East Timorese rebellion of 1911–12 against Portuguese colonial authorities
 Arab Revolt or Great Arab Revolt of 1917, against the Ottoman Empire
 1936–1939 Arab revolt in Palestine, that would come to be known as "the Great Revolt".

Fiction 
 The war against the Evil Horde in She-Ra: Princess of Power
 The Butlerian Jihad, an event in Frank Herbert's fictional Dune universe

See also
 List of revolutions and rebellions